Small Fry may refer to:

Small fry (fish), a recently hatched fish
"Small Fry" (short story), 1885 Anton Chekhov story
"Small Fry" (song), a song written in 1938 by Hoagy Carmichael and Frank Loesser
Small Fry (album), 1941 Bing Crosby album
Small Fry (film), 2011 Pixar computer animated short
Small Fry (book), 2018 memoir by Lisa Brennan-Jobs

See also
Small Fry Club, 1940s TV series hosted by Bob Emery
Small & Frye, 1983 TV series produced by Disney